NGC 487 is a barred spiral galaxy located about 250 million light-years away from Earth in the constellation Cetus. NGC 487's calculated velocity is 5949 km/s. NGC 487 was discovered by American astronomer Francis Leavenworth on November 28, 1885.

See also 
 List of NGC objects (1–1000)
 NGC 1300
 NGC 491

References

External links 
  

Spiral galaxies
Barred spiral galaxies
Cetus (constellation)
0487
4958
Astronomical objects discovered in 1885